Dosinia lupinus is a species of bivalves belonging to the family Veneridae.

The species is found in Europe, Western Asia and Africa.

Earlier, one subspecies (Dosinia lupinus orbignyi (Dunker, 1845) was recognized, but later it was raised to species level: Dosinia orbignyi (Dunker, 1845).

References

lupinus
Bivalves described in 1758
Bivalves of Europe
Bivalves of Asia 
Bivalves of Africa